Tomás "Tom" Coman (born 10 November 1979 in Thurles) is a retired Irish athlete who specialised in the 400 metres. He represented his country at the 2000 Summer Olympics, as well as the 1999 and 2001 World Championships.

His personal bests in the event are 45.84 seconds outdoors (Santry 2000) and 46.34 seconds indoor (Vienna 2002).

Competition record

1: Did not start in the final

References

1979 births
Living people
Irish male sprinters
Athletes (track and field) at the 2000 Summer Olympics
Olympic athletes of Ireland
People from Thurles
Alumni of Waterford Institute of Technology
Competitors at the 1999 Summer Universiade
Competitors at the 2005 Summer Universiade